Henry Alberto Bejarano Matarrita (born 1979) is a Costa Rican professional football referee. He has been a full international for FIFA since 2011. He received his first major assignment in April 2015 when he was assigned as the referee for the second leg of the 2015 CONCACAF Champions League Finals.

References 

1979 births
Living people
Costa Rican football referees
CONCACAF Champions League referees
CONCACAF Gold Cup referees